Giolla Finna mac Uallacháin  was lord of Síol Anmchadha from 1096-1101.

Biography

Giolla Finna mac Uallacháin (also known as Gillafin Mac Coulahan) was a member of the Síol Anmchadha dynasty and one of the few members of the Coulahan clan to merit mention in the Irish annals. He succeeded to the kingship of the area upon the death of Madudan Reamhar Ua Madadhan, but was killed by the latter's son Diarmaid Ua Madadhan in 1101.

Among Gillafin's descendants were Professor Nicholas Colohan (1806-1890), Arthur Colahan (1884–1952), And Count Luke Woulahan, as heir to the chief of the Ó hUallacháin name.

References
 O'Madáin: History of the O'Maddens of Hy-Many, Gerard Madden, 2004. .
 The Colahans - A Remarkable Galway Family, Diarmuid Ó Cearbhaill, Journal of the Galway Archaeological and Historical Society, volume 54, 2002, pp. 121–140.

External links
 https://archive.org/stream/tribescustomsofh00odonuoft/tribescustomsofh00odonuoft_djvu.txt
 https://sites.rootsweb.com/~irlkik/ihm/uimaine.htm#anm

People from County Galway
11th-century Irish monarchs
1101 deaths
Year of birth unknown